Parasinilabeo microps is a species of cyprinid fish endemic to China.

References

Fish described in 2001
Parasinilabeo